John Callahan (born 1964) is best known as a former professional wrestler in the World Wrestling Federation (WWF) and later, as the Circulation Director of the Milford Daily News in Milford, Massachusetts. He held the New England Heavyweight title twice, from June 1994 to November 1995, and the New England Tag Team title (along with fellow wrestler Big City Mike) from November 1993 to July 1995.

Early life

John Callahan was born in Milford, Massachusetts and as early as the age of 10, he was taken with the exploits of such colorful and established professional wrestlers as George "The Animal" Steele and Manuel Soto. He soon came to realize that professional wrestling was his destiny, watching his heroes perform on the family television and thinking to himself, "Wow, they can do that and get away with it?". 
  
He noted that his friends joined him in the construction of a makeshift wrestling ring, or "squared circle", and imitated the mannerisms and techniques of their heroes, holding their own matches.

As time passed and his friends went on with their lives, Callahan came to a decision which would change his life - he decided to pursue his passion and join the world of professional wrestling. In 1979, he packed his bags and left home to study the sport under the guidance of a man recognized as a true master, the legendary Edward Władysław Spulnik, better known as "Killer Kowalski", in Salem, Massachusetts.

Education under Killer Kowalski (1979)

In 1979, young John Callahan began training with Walter "Killer" Kowalski at his wrestling school at the YMCA in Salem. Kowalski found him to be a gifted pupil blessed with raw physical and athletic gifts, so much so that within just a few short months he deemed Callahan ready to turn professional. 
 
Callahan fulfilled his lifelong dream and officially signed a contract with the World Wrestling Federation just as the sport which was on the verge of achieving unprecedented popularity.

Experiences in the World Wrestling Federation

In 1979, John Callahan began his professional wrestling career with the World Wrestling Federation. With both the WWF and later, other organizations, the "small town" boy found himself traveling throughout much of North America. He had come a long way from "figure four leg-locks" and "sleeper holds" he had administered and sent his friends home sore with as a boy back in Baltimore.

Callahan's first major match took place in April 1981 against another young wrestler who perhaps more than anyone helped elevate the popularity of the sport of wrestling and the WWF, Hulk Hogan. The match took place in the Boston Garden in front of a packed house, which included many of Callahan's friends and family members. Unfortunately, Callahan was defeated and later recalled, "All I saw was the heads (of the crowd) silhouetted by the lights." Despite the loss, he was encouraged by the fact that his nervousness had melted away as soon as he got into character and entered the ring. "Once you start doing what you do, you forget there are 22,000 people watching.".

Popular names wrestled and characters created

In addition to Hulk Hogan, Callahan wrestled such notable personalities as the Junkyard Dog, Tony Atlas and Rowdy Roddy Piper. A personal favorite was his epic Allentown, PA battle against the Iron Shiek, which resulted in another Callahan defeat, this time within three minutes. The Shiek went on to wrestle Hogan himself, some two weeks later.

With characters like Hogan, Piper, and the Shiek leading the way, the popularity of wrestling grew to unprecedented heights. Callahan recognized the significance that marketing played in this, both to the sport as well as the individual careers of the people performing within it. It was at this point that while some wrestlers took the path of the "good guy," Callahan opted for a "villain" persona. 
 
Over the years he created and performed as characters such as the "Baltimore Terror", the "American Ninja", and finally "Big John Callahan". Another character he created during a wrestling stint in Quebec, Canada, was "Sgt. Muldoon". This persona was quickly dropped when a promoter asked why he had inexplicably decided to play an Irish wrestler from a world populated entirely by French-Canadiens, "rather than Southie".

Ever the student of the sports entertainment aspect of professional wrestling, Callahan learned to listen to the audience and recognize where his limits were. "You want to work the audience so that at the end of the night, they know they saw something they want to come back and see again.".

Injuries and the end of wrestling career

Ultimately, like many professional athletes the mental and physical rigors of constant travel and injuries began to take their toll on Callahan. Throughout his career he battled dislocated joints and broken bones. On at least one occasion, he claims to have fought through a 10-minute match despite a dislocated knee. On another, he continued wrestling even after his nose had been shattered, the match finally coming to an end when he could no longer breathe. "People come in (to the matches) looking to believe everything they see, so you might as well make it believable," Callahan later said.

It was during a match in 1999, though, when Callahan limped out of the ring for the last time - he had dislocated his hip. A doctor determined he needed a hip replacement. "I decided if I wasn't going to be able to put on a show anymore and really entertain, it wasn't worth doing," he later told an interviewer. Callahan quietly fell out of the spotlight and began an eight-year hiatus from the wrestling world he loved for most of his life. He claimed that he couldn't even bear to watch matches on television.

You can now see Callahan working as Sgt. Muldoon for the Woonsocket, Rhode Island based Showcase Pro Wrestling as the ring announcer and conducting interview segments during the shows.

Circulation director, Milford Daily News

With his wrestling career over, Callahan was at a crossroads. Searching for a new direction in his career, he stumbled across a want ad for an opportunity that intrigued him. It was for the Circulation Director of the Milford Daily News in his adopted hometown of Milford, MA. The job was one he was born to perform.

Given his interest in marketing, which is recognized by many in the industry as the lifeblood of any newspaper, he conceived of recognition programs for the newspaper's carriers, the most successful of which was the "Bonus Bucks Bonanza" program. In 1991, Callahan brought a celebration of "Newspaper Carrier Day" to the Milford Daily News, which was held at Fino Field in Milford. Efforts for coverage by CNN and hopes of an appearance by comedic actor Chris Elliot were unsuccessful, but Carrier Day is still seen as a highpoint in Milford Daily News history.

Unfortunately, Callahan's time at the Milford Daily News was to end somewhat abruptly, when a dispute over the dismissal of an independent contractor led to a falling out with publisher Thomas Sawyer and Callahan's departure.

Induction to the New England Professional Wrestling Hall of Fame (2010)

Despite all of the hardships he endured in his wrestling career, Callahan always said he would go back and do it all over again if he could, perhaps, though, with some help from steroids and a "more vicious attitude. . 
 
"In 2010, he received word that his career would be recognized officially by his induction to the New England Wrestling Hall of Fame. Looking back at that time, Callahan said, "It went by too fast. In the blink of an eye 30 years were gone.

References

External links 
 http://webarchive.loc.gov/all/20150903201331/http%3A//www.naa.org/Topics%2Dand%2DTools/Audience%2Dand%2DCirculation/Carriers%2DIndependent%2DContractors/International%2DNewspaper%2DCarrier%2DDay.aspx
 http://milford-ma.patch.com/blogs/thomas--sawyers-blog

American male professional wrestlers
Sportspeople from Baltimore
1964 births
Living people